"Dumb Love" is a song by American recording artist Sean Kingston. The song was originally released as the third single from Kingston's third studio album, Back 2 Life, but was taken off for unknown reasons. It was released on September 7, 2010 as a digital download in the United States. It peaked at number 84 on the Billboard Hot 100 and 92 on the Canadian Hot 100. The song rose to popularity due to Sean's appearance and performance of the song on The Suite Life on Deck. The song was written by Steven Battey and Carlos Battey and the Smeezingtons (Ari Levine, Philip Lawrence, and Bruno Mars). The song's chorus interpolates elements from "Come Go With Me" (1957) by the Del-Vikings, as written by Clarence Quick.

Background
The single was released on iTunes on September 7, 2010. Kingston sang the song on The Suite Life on Deck episode Party On!, which he guest starred on, in order to win London Tipton's affection.

Track listing

Chart performance

Release history

References

2010 singles
2010 songs
Sean Kingston songs
Epic Records singles
Music videos directed by Director X
Song recordings produced by the Smeezingtons
Songs written by Bruno Mars
Songs written by Philip Lawrence (songwriter)
Songs written by Ari Levine
Songs written by Carlos Battey
Songs written by Steven Battey